Duc de Poix in the French peerage was created by Louis XIV in 1663, for Charles de Créquy (1623-1687), who served as ambassador to Spain, England, Rome and Bavaria.

The title was taken from de Créquy's home town of Poix-de-Picardie but it became extinct when he died in 1687 without a male heir. It now forms one of the secondary titles of the current ducs de Mouchy.